Dendrobium fimbriatum, commonly known as 流苏石斛 (liu su shi hu), is a species of orchid. It is native to China (Guangxi, Guizhou, Yunnan), the Himalayas (northern and eastern India, Nepal, Bhutan, Bangladesh, Assam, Arunachal Pradesh) and Indochina (Myanmar, Thailand, Laos, Vietnam, Peninsular Malaysia). It grows on tree trunks in dense forests or on damp rocks in mountain valleys.

Images

References

External links

fimbriatum
Orchids of Asia
Flora of Indo-China
Flora of the Indian subcontinent
Flora of Peninsular Malaysia
Plants described in 1823
Taxa named by William Jackson Hooker